Hysterographium is a genus of fungi of uncertain placement in the class Dothideomycetes. It was circumscribed by Czech mycologist August Carl Joseph Corda in 1842.

Species
Hysterographium acaciae
Hysterographium andicola
Hysterographium arctostaphyli
Hysterographium awaradii
Hysterographium baccarinii
Hysterographium cocos
Hysterographium cumingii
Hysterographium cuyanum
Hysterographium dalbergiae
Hysterographium depressum
Hysterographium elasticae
Hysterographium flexuosum
Hysterographium fraxini
Hysterographium fuegianum
Hysterographium grammodes
Hysterographium ilicicola
Hysterographium indicum
Hysterographium kansense
Hysterographium longisporum
Hysterographium minus
Hysterographium minutum
Hysterographium multiseptatum
Hysterographium multiseptum
Hysterographium oleae
Hysterographium palamalaiense
Hysterographium pithecellobii
Hysterographium pleosporoides
Hysterographium praeandinum
Hysterographium quercinum
Hysterographium spinicola
Hysterographium vanderystii
Hysterographium varians
Hysterographium vulvatum

References

External links
 

Dothideomycetes genera
Taxa named by August Carl Joseph Corda
Taxa described in 1842